Pongalur block is a revenue block in the Tiruppur district of Tamil Nadu, India. It has a total of 16 panchayat villages.  PAP canal flows through Pongalur.

References 

 

Revenue blocks of Tiruppur district